Starmount is a predominantly residential neighborhood in Charlotte, North Carolina. Located along South Boulevard, it is between Sharon Road West and Emerywood Drive, with the Little Sugar Creek its eastern border. Consisting of nearly 1,400 homes, it is one of the largest established neighborhoods and is known for its ranch-style or split-level brick bungalow homes.

History 
Starmount was constructed during the early 1960s by Ervin Construction Company. Phase One of construction took place primarily from Starbrook Drive south to Sherbourne, then spread north towards Archdale Drive at Phase Two. Homes were built using true pine 2 x 4s, hardwood floors and brick construction.

Subdivisions 
Starmount has three other residential subdivisions within its area, they are: Lennox Square, Park South Station, and Starmount Cove. Several large apartment complexes can also be found at Sharon Lakes Road.

Transportation infrastructure

Mass transit
The Lynx Blue Line, operated by the Charlotte Area Transit System (CATS), has three stations with parking that are all located along South Boulevard:
 Sharon Road West station
 Arrowood station
 Archdale station

CATS also operates the following bus routes, all of which borders the neighborhood:
 #12 (South Boulevard)
 #43 (Ballantyne)
 #57 (Archdale/SouthPark)

References

Neighborhoods in Charlotte, North Carolina
Populated places established in the 1960s